Forbidden Love is a 2020 Indian ZEE5 original Hindi-language miniseries directed by Pradeep Sarkar, Priyadarshan, Aniruddha Roy Chowdhury and Mahesh Manjrekar starring Aditya Seal, Pooja Kumar, Ali Fazal, Omkar Kapoor, Patralekha, Aahana Kumra, Chandan Roy Sanyal, Raima Sen and Rannvijay Singh. The show was released on ZEE5 in 4 chapters. Anamika & Arranged Marriage on 9 September 2020 and Diagnosis of Love & Rule of Games on 24 September.

Chapters

Cast 
 Aditya Seal as  Ishaan
 Pooja Kumar as Anamika
 Omkar Kapoor as Neel
 Patralekha as Keya
 Ali Fazal as Dev
 Rannvijay Singh as Aditya
 Aahana Kumra as Priya
 Chandan Roy Sanyal
 Mahesh Manjrekar as Sudha's Husband
 Raima Sen as Sudha
 Vaibhav
Sayani Mukhopadhyay as Sex Worker 1
Arundhati Mukharjee as Sex Worker 2

Release 
ZEE5 released the first movie on the platform on 9 September 2020.

References

External links 
 
 
 
 
 Forbidden Love on ZEE5

Hindi-language web series